"Mi Mala" ("My Mean Girl") is a single by Venezuelan duo Mau y Ricky and Colombian singer Karol G. The song was co-written by the duo, Karol G, Matluck, Jon Leone, Camilo Echeverry and its producer, Tainy. A remix version featuring Becky G, Lali and Leslie Grace was released on 9 February 2018.

Background 
The song was written by Mau y Ricky, Karol G, Camilo Echeverry, Max Matluck, Tainy and Jon Leone. It is about two people who don't want to be in a serious relationship with each other, so they know that the other sees other people, but they don't care.

Charts

Remix version

On 9 February 2018 a remix version featuring vocals by Becky G, Lali and Leslie Grace was released. Its music video was shot on 18 January 2018 in Miami, Florida, and was directed by David Bohórquez. The song received a nomination for Remix of the Year at the 31st edition of the Lo Nuestro Awards.

Background and composition
For the remix, Mau y Ricky invited three more female voices. On the Spotify's exclusive behind the scenes, Ricky said "I think it's very important to support female talent, [so] it gets more powerful with the other ladies." Karol G admitted that she was "excited" about the song because it "is loyal to what [she]'s ever wanted with [her] project: give women reasons to feel inspired and great." Leslie Grace stated that "in the music industry, women are getting hold of their territory" and Lali added that "it's time for women to join". Finally, Becky G also expressed her excitement by saying: "we are this younger generation in music, and to be able to share the light is just incredible."

Becky G and Grace had previously worked together on their joint single "Díganle". The song peaked at number 13 on the Billboard Latin Digital Song Sales chart and was certified Latin platinum by the Recording Industry Association of America certification (RIAA). In 2011, Mau y Ricky ("MR" back then) had opened a show for Teen Angels, Lali's former group, at the Gran Rex Theatre in Buenos Aires.

Critical reception
Billboard described the song as a "sizzling remix of the slow reggaeton jam." Additionally, Diana Marti from E! Online said that the track "is infectious and you'll find yourself leaving it on repeat." Fuse's Jeff Benjamin added that "[the remix] is more than just a hot rework, it's a larger spotlight on the great female talent coming from the Latin music community and highlights the necessity to shed more light on it".

Music video
The official music video was shot by director David Bohórquez in Miami, Florida on 18 January 2018. It premiered on Spotify's mobile app on 9 February 2018, on the newly relaunched ¡Viva Latino! playlist. Three days after, on 12 February, it made its premiere on Vevo. Bohórquez had previously directed the music video for the original version.

In the music video, Karol, Becky, Leslie and Lali all get to pose and smize for a camera recording them, but they're not doing it for Mau y Ricky's affection. Instead, the guys get to coolly hang out with their co-stars' faces projecting on screens. Furthermore, the diversity of Latin music's female superstars are on display here with all different kinds of body types, singing styles, fashion looks and hair colors are displayed by all four women who personify the exciting range of types of people around the world rocking the industry.

Charts

Weekly charts

Year-end charts

Certifications

Credits and personnel
Credits adapted from Tidal.

 Mauricio Montaner — vocals, songwriting, executive producer
 Ricky Montaner — vocals, songwriting, executive producer, guitar
 Karol G — vocals, songwriting
 Becky G — vocals
 Lali Espósito — vocals
 Leslie Grace — vocals
 Tainy — songwriting, production
 Max Matluck — songwriting
 Jon Leone — songwriting, vocal production
 Camilo Echeverry — songwriting
 Earcandy – mixing
 Mike Bozzi – mastering
 Alejandro M. Reglero – A&R

References

2018 songs
2018 singles
Spanish-language songs
Latin pop songs
Reggaeton songs
Becky G songs
Karol G songs
Lali Espósito songs
Leslie Grace songs
Songs with feminist themes
Songs written by Tainy
Songs written by Camilo (singer)
Songs written by Karol G
Song recordings produced by Tainy
Songs written by Mau Montaner